Jimmy Fraser (born 28 April 1948) is an Australian retired football (soccer) player. Fraser played eight matches for  Australia. He is the current goalkeeping coach of the Philippines women's national team.

Playing career

Club career
Fraser played for St. George Budapest in the New South Wales first division between 1970 and 1974.

International career
Fraser played his eight matches for Australia in the qualification matches for the 1974 FIFA World Cup.

References

Australian soccer players
1948 births
Living people
Association football goalkeepers
Australia international soccer players
Australian soccer coaches
Australian expatriate soccer coaches